The 2008–09 KHL season was the inaugural season of the Kontinental Hockey League. It started on September 2, 2008, and finished on April 12, 2009. 24 teams each played 56 games.

League business

NHL player transfer
KHL teams signed several players from the NHL, including Jaromír Jágr, Alexander Radulov, Ray Emery, Sergei Brylin, Ladislav Nagy, Jozef Stümpel, Marcel Hossa, Ben Clymer, Alexei Zhitnik, Bryan Berard and Chris Simon.

Dispute
A dispute between the two leagues over some of these signings was supposed to have been resolved by an agreement signed on July 10, whereby each league would honor the contracts of the other, but the signing of Alexander Radulov was made public one day after the agreement (though it was actually signed two days prior to the agreement taking effect), leading to an investigation by the International Ice Hockey Federation.

Finances

Ownership
On a deal dated October 30, Magnitogorsk Iron and Steel Works bought 11.76% of the KHL.

Salary cap
The league has implemented a salary cap.

Economic trouble
Metallurg Novokuznetsk has so far experienced difficulty financing its operations, largely due to the global financial crisis of 2008. Team sponsor Evraz Group is rumoured to be cutting funding. There is a possibility the team will cease operations by New Years.

HC MVD has experienced delays in paying players, while Khimik Voskresensk has run itself into debt. Metallurg Magnitogorsk has been forced to cut staff expenditures by 30%. Avangard Omsk owner Roman Abramovich has promised to continue financial support so long as the team maintains good results. Other teams experiencing financial limitations are  Vityaz Chekhov, Atlant Moscow Oblast, Lokomotiv Yaroslavl, HC CSKA Moscow.

As far as the league is concerned it has devised a "crisis package" for dealing with the economic turmoil. Cuts will be made to non-salary expenditures, such as pre-game activity, training camps, and elimination of pre-season tournaments. Mid-level player salaries may also be rolled back. Divisional re-alignment will also take place for the 2009–10 season to cut down on travel costs.

Inaugural All-Star Game
The inaugural KHL All-Star Game took place on January 10, 2009. Each team consisted of ten forwards, five defensemen, and two goaltenders. The starting rosters were voted upon on the KHL.ru website and decided by December 22. The secondary lines and goaltenders were to be voted upon by the media, and announced December 26, with the following players and reserves announced by January 8. The game took place in Moscow's Red Square, with Team Jágr (International All-Stars) defeating Team Yashin (Russian All-Stars) 7–6.

Regular season

Death of Alexei Cherepanov

On October 13, 2008 during a match between Avangard Omsk and Vityaz Chekhov, forward Alexei Cherepanov died due to a heart condition.

On December 29, 2008, Russian investigators revealed that he suffered from myocarditis, a condition where not enough blood gets to the heart, and that he should not have been playing professional hockey. The federal Investigative Committee also announced that a chemical analysis of Cherepanov's blood and urine samples allowed experts to conclude "that for several months Alexei Cherepanov engaged in doping". Official sources have stated the banned substance taken was nikethamide, a stimulant, and that it had been taken 3 hours prior to the game in which he died.

Omsk club director Mikhail Denisov has since been fired, whereas the league Disciplinary Committee has since removed Omsk's doctors from that role with the club, and has suspended Avangard general manager Anatoly Bardin and team president Konstantin Potapov. The KHL Disciplinary Committee met on this matter on January 5, and also suspended Chekhov's team president.

League standings

Final standings.

Points have been awarded as follows:
3 Points for a win in regulation ("W")
2 Points for a win in overtime ("OTW") or penalty shootout ("SOW")
1 Point for a loss in a penalty shootout ("SOL") or overtime ("OTL")
0 Points for a loss in regulation ("L")

Divisional standing

League leaders

Goaltenders: minimum 15 games played

Scoring leaders
GP = Games played; G = Goals; A = Assists; Pts = Points; +/– = Plus-minus; PIM = Penalty minutes

Playoffs

Playoff leaders

Source: khl.ru

Goaltenders: minimum 5 games played

Scoring leaders
Source: khl.ru

  
GP = Games played; G = Goals; A = Assists; Pts = Points; +/– = Plus-minus; PIM = Penalty minutes

Leading goaltenders 
Source: khl.ru

GP = Games played; Min = Minutes played; W = Wins; L = Losses; GA = Goals against; SO = Shutouts; SV% = Save percentage; GAA = Goals against average

Awards

Players of the Month

Best KHL players of each month.

KHL Awards
On 15 May 2009, the KHL held their first award ceremony. A total of 23 different awards were handed out to teams, players, officials and media. The most important trophies are listed in the table below.

References 

 
Kontinental Hockey League seasons
1
1